Julau is a district, in Sarikei Division, Sarawak, Malaysia.

Town and villages

Julau
Julau District Office is located in the town.

Nanga Entabai
A primary school named "SK Nanga Entabai" is located here.

Nanga Lasi
Construction of a steel bridge across the Julau river started in November 2021.

Nanga Maong
Nanga Maong public health clinic is located here.

References